Shahi Qila may refer to:

Shahi Qila, Jaunpur, a fort built during the 14th century in India
Shahi Qila, Lahore, a citadel built during the 17th century in Pakistan